General Prabhu Ram Sharma (born 5 January 1964) is the present Chief of the Army Staff (COAS) of the Nepalese Army. He took the oath from the president of Nepal on 9 September 2021. He succeeded General Purna Chandra Thapa.

Sharma was born on January 5, 1964, in Kathmandu. He entered into Nepal army in 1984 as a Second Lieutenant in Purano Gorakh Battalion. He has a master’s degree in history from Tribhuwan University and master of philosophy in Defense and Strategic Study from University of Madras.

Sharma is married to Sunita Sharma and has two daughters.

Sharma was conferred as the honorary General of the Indian Army by the Indian President Ram Nath Kovind on 10 November 2021 while Sharma was on a four-day long visit to India.

References

Nepalese generals
University of Madras alumni
Tribhuvan University alumni
Living people
1964 births

Nepalese military personnel
National Defence College, India alumni